Cha Do-jin (born Im Sung-kyu on 15 July 1983) is a South Korean actor.

Filmography

Television series

Film

Awards and nominations

References

External links
 

1983 births
Living people
South Korean male television actors
South Korean male film actors